Statistics of Úrvalsdeild in the 1991 season.

Overview
It was contested by 10 teams, and Víkingur won the championship. Víkingur's Guðmundur Steinsson and FH's Hörður Magnússon were the joint top scorers with 13 goals.

League standings

Results
Each team played every opponent once home and away for a total of 18 matches.

References

Úrvalsdeild karla (football) seasons
Iceland
Iceland
1991 in Icelandic football